Eucharides Painter is the common nickname of an ancient Greek artist who decorated but did not sign Attic vases. Neither his real name, nor the dates of his birth and death are known. Presumably this artist was a pupil of the Nikoxenos Painter.

The name was introduced in 1911 by John Beazley, a classical historian at the University of Oxford, who had a special interest in Attic vases. Through close examination of stylistic details, Beazley and other scholars recognized pieces painted by the same artist. In this case, the nickname appreciates the anonymous painter's repeated use of kalos inscriptions praising the beauty of a named young boy. A vase with the inscription ΚΑΛΟΣ ΕΥΧΑΡΙΔΕΣ ("kalos Eucharides", i.e. Eucharides is beautiful) became the source of the artist's name.

The Eucharides Painter was working in Athens in the years from about 500 BC to 470 BC. At this time the technique of vase painting switched from black-figure to red-figure illustrations, a process commonly attributed to the Andokides Painter. Correspondingly, both black-figured and red-figured vases are attributed to the Eucharides Painter. Their shapes range from large kraters to small cups. Scenes were drawn from mythology and daily life.

Many of this artist's known works were retrieved from Etruscan tombs in Italy. Recently, one of his attic vases was claimed to be looted and was repossessed by the Italian State.  NY Observer    NY Times

Vases
Examples of Attic vases attributed to the Eucharides Painter are on display around the world, e.g.: 
 Getty Museum, Malibu, California, USA (no. 86.AE.227). Attic red-figure water jar illustrating a young boy and a reveller with the eponymous inscription 
Kalos Eucharides 
(Beazley Archive Database Number 275122)
 Vatican City, Museo Gregoriano Etrusco Vaticano (no. H545) Attic red-figure hygria illustrating a scene from Homer´s Iliad, the killing of Hektor by Achilles  (Beazley Archive Vase Number 202267)
 London, British Museum (no. B178). Attic black-figured amphora illustrating Dionysos with Ivy and Kantharos between Satyrs. (Beazley Archive Vase Number 302996).
 Paris, Musée du Louvre. Attic red-figure amphora illustrating Satyre et Menade. 
 St. Petersburg, The State Hermitage Museum. (Inv. No. Б. 2604). Attic red-figure hydria-kalpis illustrating Nike with tripod.   
 Hamburg, Museum für Kunst und Gewerbe. Attic red-figure wine amphora illustrating the killing of Argos by Hermes. 
 Bremen, Antikenmuseum im Schnoor/ Sammlung Zimmermann. 
Black-figured pseudo-panathenaic amphora.
 Copenhagen, National Museum Attic red-figured stamnos illustrating a Woman with a Mirror, a Seated Youth Looks at a Dog. Inscription. 
Beazley Archive Database Number 202230

Literature
Beazley, J. D., Attic Red figured Vase Painters, 2nd edition (Oxford, 1963) [= ARV²]
Beazley, J. D., Attic Black-figure Vase-painters (Oxford, 1956)

External links
Biography

5th-century BC Athenians
Ancient Greek vase painters